Christophe Bazivamo is the Minister of Lands, Environment, Forestry, Water, and Mines in Rwanda.  In 2003 and 2004 he was the Minister of Local Government, Community Development and Social Affairs. In 2005 he was the Minister of Internal Security.  In 2000, 2001 and 2002 he served as Executive Secretary of the National Electoral Commission. He is a member of the Rwandan Patriotic Front, and since 2002 he has been the vice-president of the party.

Bazivamo is now a member of east African community parliament.

References
 Rwandan government website with list of government ministers
 Article quoting Bazivamo in 2004
 Press release mentioning Bazivamo as election official and party vice president

Year of birth missing (living people)
Living people
Government ministers of Rwanda
Environment ministers of Rwanda
Forestry ministers of Rwanda
Interior ministers of Rwanda
Mining ministers of Rwanda
Water ministers of Rwanda